The 40 mm Under Barrel Grenade Launcher, is a single shot grenade launcher developed by ARDE and Ordnance Factory Tiruchirappalli for use with the INSAS and AK-47 rifles used by the Indian Army. Stand alone versions of the grenade launcher exist.

As of September 2019, around 10,000 UBGLs were manufactured.

History
In 2020, its ammunition's production began in India (it was earlier imported), in Ammunition Factory Khadki, Pune under Atmanirbhar Bharat. The first ammunition consignment was sent to the Border Security Force.

Design
The 40mm UBGL can be attached to Indian INSAS and AK-47 rifles, and has a 3-point attachment for rigidity. The UBGL has an in-built safety to prevent accidental firing. The trigger system is located on the side of the barrel, allowing the soldier to fire both the rifle and grenade launcher without having to change his firing posture. Its maximum range is 400 metres.

The weapon uses a simple ladder sight mechanism, similar to the GP-25. It also has tritium illuminated sights for night firing. The ammunition fired by the UBGL is similar to the Milkor MGL used by the Indian Army, allowing for standardisation.

The UBGL's can be equipped with Air Burst rounds for enhanced lethality.These rounds uses programmable electronic fuse for detonation and has self destructive capabilities in case of missing the target.

To install the UBGL, the handguard of an INSAS/AK-type rifle needs to be removed first before the device is installed.

References

Notes

External links
 

Firearms of India
40×46mm grenade launchers
Defence Research and Development Organisation